Danilova is an impact crater on Venus. It is named after the Russian ballet dancer Maria Danilova.

External links
  Image

References

Impact craters on Venus